Calais speciosus is a species of click beetle in the genus Calais.

Biocontrol use
In Hawaii and in Asia where there are coconut rhinoceros beetles (Oryctes rhinoceros), Calais speciosus has been introduced to control their population, as it may eat the grubs or eggs of Oryctes rhinoceros.

References

Elateridae
Beetles described in 1767